Helianthus angustifolius is a species of sunflower known by the common name narrowleaf sunflower or swamp sunflower. It is native to the south-central and eastern United States, found in all the coastal states from Texas to Long Island, and inland as far as Missouri. It is typically found in the coastal plain habitat (both the Atlantic and Gulf), particularly in wet areas.

Helianthus angustifolius is often cultivated for its bright, showy yellow flowers. Leaves are long and narrow, up to 15 cm (6 inches) long. It is a perennial herb sometimes as much as 150 cm (5 feet) tall. One plant can produce 3-16 flower heads, each with 10-20 ray florets surrounding at least 75 disc florets.

References

External links
United States Department of Agriculture Plants Profile
Photo of herbarium specimen at Missouri Botanical Garden, collected in Missouri in 1993

angustifolia
Flora of the United States
Plants described in 1753
Taxa named by Carl Linnaeus